Concepts and Techniques in Modern Geography, abbreviated CATMOG, is a series of 59 short publications, each focused on an individual method or theory in geography.

Background and impact

Concepts and Techniques in Modern Geography were produced by the Study Group in Quantitative Methods of the Institute of British Geographers. Each CATMOG publication was written on an individual topic in geography rather than a series of broad topics like traditional textbooks. This à la carte approach allowed only purchasing publications on topics of interest, keeping each CATMOG relatively cheap and accessible, lowering student costs. The first of these publications was published in 1975, and the last in 1996. Each was written by someone working professionally with its topic. As they focus on core concepts of the discipline and were written by experts in the field, they are still often cited today when discussing specific topics. The Quantitative Methods Research Group (QMRG) at the Royal Geographical Society (with the Institute for British Geographers) has made the CATMOG available to download for free on their website, with only a few publications missing.

List of CATMOGs

See also

 Biogeography
 Cartography
 Cultural geography
 Ecological fallacy
 Gamma Theta Upsilon
 Geographic Information Science and Technology Body of Knowledge
 Geodesy
 Geographic information systems
 Geographic information science
 Indicators of spatial association
 Level of analysis
 Modifiable areal unit problem
 National Council for Geographic Education
 Royal Geographical Society
 Spatial autocorrelation
 Spatial heterogeneity
 Technical geography
 Time geography
 Transportation geography
 Urban geography
 Quantitative geography

References

External links
  Royal Geography Society CATMOG Catalog

Geography textbooks
Series of non-fiction books
Book series introduced in 1975